The Beylerbeyi Palace Tunnel is a historic tunnel under the Beylerbeyi Palace in Beylerbeyi neighborhood of the Üsküdar district in Istanbul, Turkey connecting Üsküdar with Beylerbeyi and Çengelköy. The reason why the tunnel was built is to separate the palace from the main road.
Commissioned by Ottoman Sultan Mahmud II (reigned 1808–1839) in 1829 and completed in 1832, the tunnel is situated under a hill on the Asian side of the Bosphorus, which is today the terrace garden of the later-built Beylebeyi Palace.

The tunnel with  clearance served  until the 1970s. It was used as museum and exhibition site after its closure. 

On 19 September 2016 the tunnel re-opened to traffic in order to ease the traffic congestion on the coastal road in the area under the Bosphorus Bridge, and later shut down again to preserve the historic structure from damage caused by exhaust emissions. The tunnel was built by Üsküdar Municipality after 40 years, Üsküdar - Beylerbeyi - Çengelköy line, which takes one and a half hours, has reduced the coastal journey to 15 minutes. Only small vehicles are allowed in the tunnel, vehicles such as buses and trucks are not allowed.

References

Tunnels in Istanbul
Tunnels completed in 1832
1832 establishments in the Ottoman Empire
Üsküdar
Road tunnels in Turkey